Andrea Lewis may refer to:

Andrea Lewis (born 1985), Canadian actress and singer
Andrea Lewis (Microsoft), Microsoft's first technical writer
Andrea Lewis (pilot), American pilot
Andrea Lewis Jarvis, lead singer of The Darling Buds